Kadal Pookkal is a 2001 Indian Tamil-language drama film written and directed by Bharathiraja, starring Murali, Manoj K. Bharathi, Uma, Prathyusha and Sindhu Menon. The film was released on 14 December 2001. Bharathiraja won the National Film Award for Best Screenplay, and Murali won the Tamil Nadu State Film Award for Best Actor.

Plot 
Karuthayya and Peter are best friends, sharing with each other their hopes and dreams. Karuthayya's plan to get his beloved sister Kayal married elsewhere is thwarted when he learns that she is in love with Peter. He hears this from Uppili, who has a soft corner for Karuthayya and vice versa. For his sister's sake, Karuthayya approaches Peter with the marriage proposal. A shocked Peter, who had all along shared an easy relationship with Kayal, consents for the sake of friendship. Peter then makes a counter proposal that Karuthayya marry his sister Maria. Peter however withholds the fact that Maria had been seduced by a man from the city and was carrying his child. Family honor being uppermost in his mind, friendship takes a back seat. But Peter does not know that Karuthayya was already aware of his sister's affair, though not of her pregnancy. Karuthayya, knowing his friend's aggressive nature, had not told Peter about the matter earlier. Karuthayya now throws the ball back in Peter's court, asking him to first get Maria's consent. Sure that Maria would not give her consent for the marriage. But to his shock Maria agrees.

Forced by her mother and Peter to toe the line, she had no other option. The two pairs get married. While Peter and Kayal are blissfully happy, Karuthayya and Maria have their own crosses to bear. A guilt-stricken Maria finally confesses to Karuthayya about Peter's treacherous act. A shocked and hurt Karuthayya goes to confront Peter. The man from the city appears on the scene. A furious Peter takes the unsuspecting youth on a boat ride, ties a stone on him, and dumps him into the sea. Karuthayya, who reaches the place, tries to save the guy.

Cast 
Murali as Karuthaiya
Manoj K. Bharathi as Peter (Voice-over by Ranjith)
Umashankari as Kayal
Sindhu as Mariyam
Prathyusha as Uppili
Puthu Kavithai Jyothi as Peter's mother
Shyam Ganesh as Fernandes
Vaiyapuri
Santhana Bharathi
Sridhar as Susai

Production 
The film set in the backdrop of sea and was shot completely in Nagercoil.

Soundtrack 
Soundtrack was composed by Deva and lyrics were written by Vairamuthu. Venky Chennai Online called it "A lovely sea breeze by Deva".

Critical reception 
Tulika of Rediff wrote that Bharathiraja "shows no sign of being able to change his storytelling style to match the times". Malini Mannath of Chennai Online wrote, "it is a well-crafted script, the tale well told, the narration moving smoothly, and the scenes emotion-charged."

References

External links 
 

2000s Tamil-language films
2001 films
Films directed by Bharathiraja
Films scored by Deva (composer)
Films whose writer won the Best Original Screenplay National Film Award